A fern (Polypodiopsida or Polypodiophyta ) is a member of a group of vascular plants (plants with xylem and phloem) that reproduce via spores and have neither seeds nor flowers. The polypodiophytes include all living pteridophytes except the lycopods, and differ from mosses and other bryophytes by being vascular, i.e., having specialized tissues that conduct water and nutrients and in having life cycles in which the branched sporophyte is the dominant phase.

Ferns have complex leaves called megaphylls, that are more complex than the microphylls of clubmosses. Most ferns are leptosporangiate ferns. They produce coiled fiddleheads that uncoil and expand into fronds. The group includes about 10,560 known extant species. Ferns are defined here in the broad sense, being all of the Polypodiopsida, comprising both the leptosporangiate (Polypodiidae) and eusporangiate ferns, the latter group including horsetails, whisk ferns, marattioid ferns, and ophioglossoid ferns.

Ferns first appear in the fossil record about 360 million years ago in the late Devonian period, but many of the current families and species did not appear until roughly 145 million years ago in the early Cretaceous, after flowering plants came to dominate many environments. The fern Osmunda claytoniana is a paramount example of evolutionary stasis; paleontological evidence indicates it has remained unchanged, even at the level of fossilized nuclei and chromosomes, for at least 180 million years.

Ferns are not of major economic importance, but some are used for food, medicine, as biofertilizer, as ornamental plants, and for remediating contaminated soil. They have been the subject of research for their ability to remove some chemical pollutants from the atmosphere. Some fern species, such as bracken (Pteridium aquilinum) and water fern (Azolla filiculoides) are significant weeds worldwide. Some fern genera, such as Azolla, can fix nitrogen and make a significant input to the nitrogen nutrition of rice paddies. They also play certain roles in folklore.

Description

 
Extant ferns are herbaceous perennials and most lack woody growth. When woody growth is present, it is found in the stem. Their foliage may be deciduous or evergreen, and some are semi-evergreen depending on the climate. Like the sporophytes of seed plants, those of ferns consist of stems, leaves and roots. Ferns differ from spermatophytes in that they reproduce by spores rather than having flowers and producing seeds. However, they also differ from spore-producing bryophytes in that, like seed plants, they are polysporangiophytes, their sporophytes branching and producing many sporangia. Also unlike bryophytes, fern sporophytes are free-living and only briefly dependent on the maternal gametophyte.

Stems 
Fern stems are often referred to as rhizomes, even though they grow underground only in some of the species. Epiphytic species and many of the terrestrial ones have above-ground creeping stolons (e.g., Polypodiaceae), and many groups have above-ground erect semi-woody trunks (e.g., Cyatheaceae).

Leaves 
The green, photosynthetic part of the plant is technically a megaphyll and in ferns, it is often referred to as a frond. New leaves typically expand by the unrolling of a tight spiral called a crozier or fiddlehead into fronds. This uncurling of the leaf is termed circinate vernation. Leaves are divided into two types: sporophylls and tropophylls. Sporophylls produce spores; tropophylls do not. Fern spores are borne in sporangia which are usually clustered to form sori. The sporangia may be covered with a protective coating called an indusium. The arrangement of the sporangia is important in classification. 

In monomorphic ferns, the fertile and sterile leaves looks morphologically the same, and are photosynthesizing in the same way. In hemidimorphic ferns, just a portion of the fertile leaf is different from the sterile leaves. And in dimorphic ferns, also called holomorphic ferns, the two types of leaves are morphologically distinct (frond dimorphism). The fertile leaves are much narrower than the sterile leaves, and may even have no green tissue at all (e.g., Blechnaceae, Lomariopsidaceae). 

The anatomy of fern leaves can be anywhere from simple to highly divided, or even indeterminate (e.g. Gleicheniaceae, Lygodiaceae). The divided forms are pinnate, where the leaf segments are completely separated from one other, or pinnatifid (partially pinnate), where the leaf segments are still partially connected. When the fronds are branched more than once, it can also be a combination of the pinnatifid are pinnate shapes. If the leaf blades are divided twice, the plant has bipinnate fronds, and tripinnate fronds if they branch three times, and all the way to tetra- and pentapinnate fronds. In tree ferns, the main stalk that connects the leaf to the stem (known as the stipe), often has multiple leaflets. The leafy structures that grow from the stipe are known as pinnae and are often again divided into smaller pinnules.

Roots 
The underground non-photosynthetic structures that take up water and nutrients from soil. They are always fibrous and structurally are very similar to the roots of seed plants.

As in all other vascular plants, the sporophyte is the dominant phase or generation in the life cycle. The gametophytes of ferns, however, are very different from those of seed plants. They are free-living and resemble liverworts, whereas those of seed plants develop within the spore wall and are dependent on the parent sporophyte for their nutrition. A fern gametophyte typically consists of:
 Prothallus: A green, photosynthetic structure that is one cell thick, usually heart or kidney shaped, 3–10 mm long and 2–8 mm broad. The prothallus produces gametes by means of:
 Antheridia: Small spherical structures that produce flagellate sperm.
 Archegonia: A flask-shaped structure that produces a single egg at the bottom, reached by the sperm by swimming down the neck.
 Rhizoids: root-like structures (not true roots) that consist of single greatly elongated cells, that absorb water and mineral salts over the whole structure. Rhizoids anchor the prothallus to the soil.

Taxonomy 

Carl Linnaeus (1753) originally recognized 15 genera of ferns and fern allies, classifying them in class Cryptogamia in two groups, Filices (e.g. Polypodium) and Musci (mosses). By 1806 this had increased to 38 genera, and has progressively increased since (see  Figure 1). Ferns were traditionally classified in the class Filices, and later in a Division of the Plant Kingdom named Pteridophyta or Filicophyta. Pteridophyta is no longer recognised as a valid taxon because it is paraphyletic. The ferns are also referred to as Polypodiophyta or, when treated as a subdivision of Tracheophyta (vascular plants), Polypodiopsida, although this name sometimes only refers to leptosporangiate ferns. Traditionally, all of the spore producing vascular plants were informally denominated the pteridophytes, rendering the term synonymous with ferns and fern allies. This can be confusing because members of the division Pteridophyta were also denominated pteridophytes (sensu stricto).

Traditionally, three discrete groups have been denominated ferns: two groups of eusporangiate ferns, the families Ophioglossaceae (adder's tongues, moonworts, and grape ferns) and Marattiaceae; and the leptosporangiate ferns. The Marattiaceae are a primitive group of tropical ferns with large, fleshy rhizomes and are now thought to be a sibling taxon to the leptosporangiate ferns. Several other groups of species were considered fern allies: the clubmosses, spikemosses, and quillworts in Lycopodiophyta; the whisk ferns of Psilotaceae; and the horsetails of Equisetaceae. Since this grouping is polyphyletic, the term fern allies should be abandoned, except in a historical context. More recent genetic studies demonstrated that the Lycopodiophyta are more distantly related to other vascular plants, having radiated evolutionarily at the base of the vascular plant clade, while both the whisk ferns and horsetails are as closely related to leptosporangiate ferns as the ophioglossoid ferns and Marattiaceae. In fact, the whisk ferns and ophioglossoid ferns are demonstrably a clade, and the horsetails and Marattiaceae are arguably another clade.

Molecular phylogenetics 

Smith et al. (2006) carried out the first higher-level pteridophyte classification published in the molecular phylogenetic era, and considered the ferns as monilophytes, as follows:
 Division Tracheophyta (tracheophytes) - vascular plants
 Sub division Euphyllophytina (euphyllophytes)
 Infradivision Moniliformopses (monilophytes)
 Infradivision Spermatophyta - seed plants, ~260,000 species
 Subdivision Lycopodiophyta (lycophytes) - less than 1% of extant vascular plants

Molecular data, which remain poorly constrained for many parts of the plants' phylogeny, have been supplemented by morphological observations supporting the inclusion of Equisetaceae in the ferns, notably relating to the construction of their sperm and peculiarities of their roots. However, there remained differences of opinion about the placement of the genus Equisetum (see Equisetopsida for further discussion). One possible solution was to denominate only the leptosporangiate ferns as "true ferns" while denominating the other three groups as fern allies. In practice, numerous classification schemes have been proposed for ferns and fern allies, and there has been little consensus among them.

The leptosporangiate ferns are sometimes called "true ferns". This group includes most plants familiarly known as ferns. Modern research supports older ideas based on morphology that the Osmundaceae diverged early in the evolutionary history of the leptosporangiate ferns; in certain ways this family is intermediate between the eusporangiate ferns and the leptosporangiate ferns. Rai and Graham (2010) broadly supported the primary groups, but queried their relationships, concluding that "at present perhaps the best that can be said about all relationships among the major lineages of monilophytes in current studies is that we do not understand them very well". Grewe et al. (2013) confirmed the inclusion of horsetails within ferns sensu lato, but also suggested that uncertainties remained in their precise placement. Other classifications have raised Ophioglossales to the rank of a fifth class, separating the whisk ferns and ophioglossoid ferns.

One problem with the classification of ferns is that of cryptic species. A cryptic species is a species that is morphologically similar to another species, but differs genetically in ways that prevent fertile interbreeding. A good example of this is the currently designated species Asplenium trichomanes (maidenhair spleenwort). This is actually a species complex that includes distinct diploid and tetraploid races. There are minor but unclear morphological differences between the two groups, which prefer distinctly differing habitats. In many cases such as this, the species complexes have been separated into separate species, thus raising the total number of species of ferns. Many more cryptic species may be yet to be discovered and designated.

Phylogeny

The ferns are related to other higher order taxa as shown in the following cladogram:

Nomenclature and subdivision 

The classification of Smith et al. (2006) treated ferns as four classes:
 Equisetopsida (Sphenopsida) 1 order, Equisetales (Horsetails) ~ 15 species
 Psilotopsida 2 orders (whisk ferns and ophioglossoid ferns) ~92 species 
 Marattiopsida 1 order, Marattiales ~ 150 species
 Polypodiopsida (Filicopsida) 7 orders (leptosporangiate ferns) ~ 9,000 species

In addition they defined 11 orders and 37 families. That system was a consensus of a number of studies, and was further refined. The phylogenetic relationships are shown in the following cladogram (to the level of orders). This division into four major clades was then confirmed using morphology alone.

Subsequently, Chase and Reveal considered both lycopods and ferns as subclasses of a class Equisetopsida (Embryophyta) encompassing all land plants. This is referred to as Equisetopsida sensu lato to distinguish it from the narrower use to refer to horsetails alone, Equisetopsida sensu stricto. They placed the lycopods into subclass Lycopodiidae and the ferns, keeping the term monilophytes, into five subclasses, Equisetidae, Ophioglossidae, Psilotidae, Marattiidae and Polypodiidae, by dividing Smith's Psilotopsida into its two orders and elevating them to subclass (Ophioglossidae and Psilotidae). Christenhusz et al. (2011) followed this use of subclasses but recombined Smith's Psilotopsida as Ophioglossidae, giving four subclasses of ferns again.

Christenhusz and Chase (2014) developed a new classification of ferns and lycopods. They used the term Polypodiophyta for the ferns, subdivided like Smith et al. into four groups (shown with equivalents in the Smith system), with 21 families, approximately 212 genera and 10,535 species;
 Equisetidae (=Equisetopsida) - monotypic (Equisetales, Equisetaceae, Equisetum) horsetails ~ 20 species)
 Ophioglossidae (=Psilotopsida) - 2 monotypic orders ~ 92 species
 Marattiidae (=Marattiopsida) - 1 monotypic order (Marattiales, Marattiaceae, 2 subfamilies) ~ 130 species
 Polypodiidae (=Polypodiopsida) - 7 orders

This was a considerable reduction in the number of families from the 37 in the system of Smith et al., since the approach was more that of lumping rather than splitting. For instance a number of families were reduced to subfamilies. Subsequently, a consensus group was formed, the Pteridophyte Phylogeny Group (PPG), analogous to the Angiosperm Phylogeny Group, publishing their first complete classification in November 2016. They recognise ferns as a class, the Polypodiopsida, with four subclasses as described by Christenhusz and Chase, and which are phylogenetically related as in this cladogram:

In the Pteridophyte Phylogeny Group classification of 2016 (PPG I), the Polypodiopsida consist of four subclasses, 11 orders, 48 families, 319 genera, and an estimated 10,578 species. Thus Polypodiopsida in the broad sense (sensu lato) as used by the PPG (Polypodiopsida sensu PPG I) needs to be distinguished from the narrower usage (sensu stricto) of Smith et al. (Polypodiopsida sensu Smith et al.) Classification of ferns remains unresolved and controversial with competing viewpoints (splitting vs lumping) between the systems of the PPG on the one hand and Christenhusz and Chase on the other, respectively. In 2018, Christenhusz and Chase explicitly argued against recognizing as many genera as PPG I.

Evolution and biogeography 

Fern-like taxa (Wattieza) first appear in the fossil record in the middle Devonian period, ca. 390 Mya. By the Triassic, the first evidence of ferns related to several modern families appeared. The great fern radiation occurred in the late Cretaceous, when many modern families of ferns first appeared. Ferns evolved to cope with low-light conditions present under the canopy of angiosperms.

Remarkably, the photoreceptor neochrome in the two orders Cyatheales and Polypodiales, integral to their adaptation to low-light conditions, was obtained via horizontal gene transfer from hornworts, a bryophyte lineage.

Due to the very large genome seen in most ferns, it was suspected they might have gone through whole genome duplications, but DNA sequencing has shown that their genome size is caused by the accumulation of mobile DNA like transposons and other genetic elements that infect genomes and get copied over and over again.

Distribution and habitat 

Ferns are widespread in their distribution, with the greatest richness in the tropics and least in arctic areas. The greatest diversity occurs in tropical rainforests. New Zealand, for which the fern is a symbol, has about 230 species, distributed throughout the country.

Ecology 

Fern species live in a wide variety of habitats, from remote mountain elevations, to dry desert rock faces, bodies of water or open fields. Ferns in general may be thought of as largely being specialists in marginal habitats, often succeeding in places where various environmental factors limit the success of flowering plants. Some ferns are among the world's most serious weed species, including the bracken fern growing in the Scottish highlands, or the mosquito fern (Azolla) growing in tropical lakes, both species forming large aggressively spreading colonies. There are four particular types of habitats that ferns are found in: moist, shady forests; crevices in rock faces, especially when sheltered from the full sun; acid wetlands including bogs and swamps; and tropical trees, where many species are epiphytes (something like a quarter to a third of all fern species).

Especially the epiphytic ferns have turned out to be hosts of a huge diversity of invertebrates. It is assumed that bird's-nest ferns alone contain up to half the invertebrate biomass within a hectare of rainforest canopy.

Many ferns depend on associations with mycorrhizal fungi. Many ferns grow only within specific pH ranges; for instance, the climbing fern (Lygodium palmatum) of eastern North America will grow only in moist, intensely acid soils, while the bulblet bladder fern (Cystopteris bulbifera), with an overlapping range, is found only on limestone.

The spores are rich in lipids, protein and calories, so some vertebrates eat these. The European woodmouse (Apodemus sylvaticus) has been found to eat the spores of Culcita macrocarpa, and the bullfinch (Pyrrhula murina) and the New Zealand lesser short-tailed bat (Mystacina tuberculata) also eat fern spores.

Life cycle

Ferns are vascular plants differing from lycophytes by having true leaves (megaphylls), which are often pinnate. They differ from seed plants (gymnosperms and angiosperms) in reproducing by means of spores and lacking flowers and seeds. Like all land plants, they have a life cycle referred to as alternation of generations, characterized by alternating diploid sporophytic and haploid gametophytic phases. The diploid sporophyte has 2n paired chromosomes, where n varies from species to species. The haploid gametophyte has n unpaired chromosomes, i.e. half the number of the sporophyte. The gametophyte of ferns is a free-living organism, whereas the gametophyte of the gymnosperms and angiosperms is dependent on the sporophyte.

The life cycle of a typical fern proceeds as follows:
 A diploid sporophyte phase produces haploid spores by meiosis (a process of cell division which reduces the number of chromosomes by a half).
 A spore grows into a free-living haploid gametophyte by mitosis (a process of cell division which maintains the number of chromosomes). The gametophyte typically consists of a photosynthetic prothallus.
 The gametophyte produces gametes (often both sperm and eggs on the same prothallus) by mitosis.
 A mobile, flagellate sperm fertilizes an egg that remains attached to the prothallus.
 The fertilized egg is now a diploid zygote and grows by mitosis into a diploid sporophyte (the typical fern plant).

Uses

Ferns are not as important economically as seed plants, but have considerable importance in some societies. Some ferns are used for food, including the fiddleheads of Pteridium aquilinum (bracken), Matteuccia struthiopteris (ostrich fern), and Osmundastrum cinnamomeum (cinnamon fern). Diplazium esculentum is also used in the tropics (for example in budu pakis, a traditional dish of Brunei) as food. Tubers from the "para", Ptisana salicina (king fern) are a traditional food in New Zealand and the South Pacific. Fern tubers were used for food 30,000 years ago in Europe. Fern tubers were used by the Guanches to make gofio in the Canary Islands. Ferns are generally not known to be poisonous to humans. Licorice fern rhizomes were chewed by the natives of the Pacific Northwest for their flavor.

Ferns of the genus Azolla, commonly known as water fern or mosquito ferns are very small, floating plants that do not resemble ferns. The mosquito ferns are used as a biological fertilizer in the rice paddies of southeast Asia, taking advantage of their ability to fix nitrogen from the air into compounds that can then be used by other plants.

Ferns have proved resistant to phytophagous insects. The gene that express the protein Tma12 in an edible fern, Tectaria macrodonta, has been transferred to cotton plants, which became resistant to whitefly infestations.

Many ferns are grown in horticulture as landscape plants, for cut foliage and as houseplants, especially the Boston fern (Nephrolepis exaltata) and other members of the genus Nephrolepis. The bird's nest fern (Asplenium nidus) is also popular, as are the staghorn ferns (genus Platycerium). Perennial (also known as hardy) ferns planted in gardens in the northern hemisphere also have a considerable following.

Several ferns, such as bracken and Azolla species are noxious weeds or invasive species. Further examples include Japanese climbing fern (Lygodium japonicum), sensitive fern (Onoclea sensibilis) and Giant water fern (Salvinia molesta), one of the world's worst aquatic weeds. The important fossil fuel coal consists of the remains of primitive plants, including ferns.

Ferns have been studied and found to be useful in the removal of heavy metals, especially arsenic, from the soil. Other ferns with some economic significance include:
 Dryopteris filix-mas (male fern), used as a vermifuge, and formerly in the US Pharmacopeia; also, this fern accidentally sprouting in a bottle resulted in Nathaniel Bagshaw Ward's 1829 invention of the terrarium or Wardian case
 Rumohra adiantiformis (floral fern), extensively used in the florist trade
 Microsorum pteropus (Java fern), one of the most popular freshwater aquarium plants.
 Osmunda regalis (royal fern) and Osmunda cinnamomea (cinnamon fern), the root fiber being used horticulturally; the fiddleheads of O. cinnamomea are also used as a cooked vegetable
 Matteuccia struthiopteris (ostrich fern), the fiddleheads used as a cooked vegetable in North America
 Pteridium aquilinum and Pteridium esculentum (bracken), the fiddleheads used as a cooked vegetable in Japan and are believed to be responsible for the high rate of stomach cancer in Japan. It is also one of the world's most important agricultural weeds, especially in the British highlands, and often poisons cattle and horses.
 Diplazium esculentum (vegetable fern), a source of food for some societies
 Pteris vittata (brake fern), used to absorb arsenic from the soil
 Polypodium glycyrrhiza (licorice fern), roots chewed for their pleasant flavor
 Tree ferns, used as building material in some tropical areas
 Cyathea cooperi (Australian tree fern), an important invasive species in Hawaii
 Ceratopteris richardii, a model plant for teaching and research, often called C-fern

Culture

Pteridologist
The study of ferns and other pteridophytes is called pteridology. A pteridologist is a specialist in the study of pteridophytes in a broader sense that includes the more distantly related lycophytes.

Pteridomania
Pteridomania is a term for the Victorian era craze of fern collecting and fern motifs in decorative art including pottery, glass, metals, textiles, wood, printed paper, and sculpture "appearing on everything from christening presents to gravestones and memorials." The fashion for growing ferns indoors led to the development of the Wardian case, a glazed cabinet that would exclude air pollutants and maintain the necessary humidity.

The dried form of ferns was also used in other arts, being used as a stencil or directly inked for use in a design. The botanical work, The Ferns of Great Britain and Ireland, is a notable example of this type of nature printing. The process, patented by the artist and publisher Henry Bradbury, impressed a specimen on to a soft lead plate. The first publication to demonstrate this was Alois Auer's The Discovery of the Nature Printing-Process.

Fern bars were popular in America in the 1970s and 80s.

Folklore

Ferns figure in folklore, for example in legends about mythical flowers or seeds. In Slavic folklore, ferns are believed to bloom once a year, during the Ivan Kupala night. Although alleged to be exceedingly difficult to find, anyone who sees a fern flower is thought to be guaranteed to be happy and rich for the rest of their life. Similarly, Finnish tradition holds that one who finds the seed of a fern in bloom on Midsummer night will, by possession of it, be guided and be able to travel invisibly to the locations where eternally blazing Will o' the wisps called aarnivalkea mark the spot of hidden treasure. These spots are protected by a spell that prevents anyone but the fern-seed holder from ever knowing their locations. In the US, ferns are thought to have magical properties such as a dried fern can be thrown into hot coals of a fire to exorcise evil spirits, or smoke from a burning fern is thought to drive away snakes and such creatures.

New Zealand 
Ferns are the national emblem of New Zealand and feature on its passport and in the design of its national airline, Air New Zealand, and its rugby team, the All Blacks.

Organisms confused with ferns

Misnomers

Several non-fern plants (and even animals) are called ferns and are sometimes confused with ferns. These include:
 Asparagus fern—This may apply to one of several species of the monocot genus Asparagus, which are flowering plants.
 Sweetfern—A flowering shrub of the genus Comptonia.
 Air fern—A group of animals called hydrozoan that are distantly related to jellyfish and corals. They are harvested, dried, dyed green, and then sold as a plant that can live on air. While it may look like a fern, it is merely the skeleton of this colonial animal.
 Fern bush—Chamaebatiaria millefolium—a rose family shrub with fern-like leaves.
 Fern tree—Jacaranda mimosifolia—an ornamental tree of the order Lamiales.
 Fern leaf tree—Filicium decipiens—an ornamental tree of the order Sapindales.

Fern-like flowering plants

Some flowering plants such as palms and members of the carrot family have pinnate leaves that somewhat resemble fern fronds. However, these plants have fully developed seeds contained in fruits, rather than the microscopic spores of ferns.

Gallery

See also

 British Pteridological Society
 Chirosia betuleti - Fern gall
 Fern spike
 Fern sports
 Paisley (design)
 Pteridophyte
 Silver fern flag

Notes

References

Bibliography

Books and theses 

 
 , see also Species Plantarum
 Lord, Thomas R. (2006). Ferns and Fern Allies of Pennsylvania. Indiana, PA: Pinelands Press. Ferns and Fern Allies of Pennsylvania - Thomas Reeves Lord
 Moran, Robbin C. (2004). A Natural History of Ferns. Portland, OR: Timber Press. .

Journal articles

Websites 

 
 
 
  
 
 
 A classification of the ferns and their allies
 A fern book bibliography
 Register of fossil Pteridophyta
 L. Watson and M.J. Dallwitz (2004 onwards). The Ferns (Filicopsida) of the British Isles. 
 Ferns and Pteridomania in Victorian Scotland
 Non-seed plant images at bioimages.vanderbilt.edu
 "American Fern Society"
 "British Pteridological Society"
 Images of ferns of Hawaii

External links
 
 

 
 
Non-timber forest products
Extant Late Devonian first appearances